Doty may refer to:

Places in the United States 
Doty, Michigan
Doty, Nebraska
Doty, Washington
Doty, Wisconsin
Doty County, Minnesota, a former name of St. Louis County
Doty Island, Wisconsin

Other uses
Doty (surname)
9721 Doty, a minor planet
SS L.R. Doty, a steamship that sank in Lake Superior in 1898

See also
Dotyville, Wisconsin, an unincorporated community